Donna Bullock (born December 11, 1955 in Dallas, Texas) is an American stage, television, and movie actress. Her first credits on television were for the first season of Dallas in 1978. Her most notable film roles include Air Force One and The Girl Next Door. Television credits include Monk, As The World Turns, All My Children, Tales from the Darkside, Murder, She Wrote, Matlock, Smallville, and The Division, among others. Her roles on stage include in plays such as A Class Act, Ragtime, and City of Angels.

References

External links

 
 
 

1955 births
20th-century American actresses
21st-century American actresses
Actresses from Dallas
American film actresses
American stage actresses
American television actresses
Living people